Namacus annulicornis is a species of leaf-footed bug in the family Coreidae. It is found in Central America and North America.

References

External links

 

Articles created by Qbugbot
Insects described in 1870
Coreini